Joseph John Gurney (2 August 1788 – 4 January 1847) was a banker in Norwich, England and a member of the Gurney family of that city. He became an evangelical minister of the Religious Society of Friends (Quakers), whose views and actions led, ultimately, to a schism among American Quakers.

Biography
Gurney was born at Earlham Hall near Norwich (now part of the University of East Anglia), the tenth child of John Gurney (1749–1809) of Gurney's Bank. He was always called Joseph John. He was the brother of Samuel Gurney, Elizabeth Fry (née Gurney), a prison and social reformer, and Louisa Hoare (née Gurney), a writer on education, and also the brother-in-law – through his sister the campaigner Hannah Buxton – of Thomas Fowell Buxton, who was also an anti-slavery campaigner. He was educated by a private tutor at Oxford, members of non-conformist religious groups being ineligible to matriculate in his day at the English universities.

In 1817 Gurney joined his sister Elizabeth Fry in her attempt to end capital punishment and institute improvements in prisons. They talked with several Members of Parliament but had little success.

In 1818 Gurney was a recorded Quaker minister. (This meant he was noted as a person gifted by God for preaching and teaching, but Quakers then neither explicitly designated individuals to take substantial roles in their worship, nor financially supported its ministers unless their travels in that role would otherwise have been impractical.)

Eventually Robert Peel, the Home Secretary, took an interest in prison reform and introduced the Gaols Act 1823, which called for paying salaries to wardens (rather than their being supported by the prisoners themselves) and putting female warders in charge of female prisoners. It also prohibited the use of irons or manacles.

Gurney and Fry visited prisons all over Great Britain to gather evidence of the horrible conditions in them to present to Parliament. They published their findings in a book entitled Prisons in Scotland and the North of England.

Gurney campaigned against slavery during trips to North America and the West Indies from 1837-1840. He promoted the Friends' belief in world peace in Ireland, Scotland, the Netherlands, Belgium, Germany, and Denmark. He also continued to promote the abolition of capital punishment.

Gurney also advocated total abstinence from alcohol. He wrote a tract on the subject called Water Is Best.

While Gurney was preaching in the United States he caused some controversy that resulted in a split among Quakers. He was concerned that Friends had so thoroughly accepted the ideas of the inner light and of Christ as the Word of God that they no longer considered the actual text of the Bible and the New Testament Christ important enough. He also stressed the traditional Protestant belief that salvation is through faith in Christ. Those who sided with him were called Gurneyite Quakers. Those who sided with John Wilbur, his opponent, were called Wilburites. (See Quaker history.)

Gurney was an early supporter of Earlham College in Richmond, Indiana and the college was named after his family home, Earlham Hall, in honour of his support and encouragement.

As a boy George Borrow used to fish the River Yare near Earlham Hall and on one occasion was caught by Joseph John Gurney. Gurney later invited the boy into the hall to see his books. In his semi-autobiographical novel Lavengro, Borrow recalls the hall with great precision: "On the right side is a green level, a smiling meadow, grass of the richest decks the side of the slope; mighty trees also adorn it, giant elms, the nearest of which, when the sun is nigh its meridian, fling a broad shadow upon the face of the ancient brick of an old English Hall. It has a stately look, that old building, indistinctly seen, as it is, among the umbrageous trees."

George Borrow describes Joseph John Gurney's objections to fishing: "'Canst thou answer to thy conscience for pulling all those fish out of the river, and leaving them to gasp in the sun?' said a voice, clear and sonorous as a bell. I started and looked round. Close behind me stood the tall figure of a man, dressed in raiment of quaint and singular fashion, but of goodly materials. He was in the prime of vigour and manhood; his features handsome and noble, but full of calmness and benevolence; at least I thought so, though they were shaded by a hat of finest beaver, with broad drooping eaves. 'Surely that is a very cruel diversion in which thou indulgest my young friend?' he continued. 'I am sorry for it... but I do not think it cruel to fish.... Simon Peter [in scripture] was a fisherman.' 'True, but they did not follow fishing as a diversion.' Whether from the effect of his words, or from want of inclination for the sport, I know not, but from that day I became less and less a practitioner of that 'cruel fishing'."

Works
Notes on a visit made to some of the prisons in Scotland and the North of England in company with Elizabeth Fry; with some general observations on the subject of prison discipline (1819)
Observations on the peculiarities of the Religious Society of Friends (1824)
Essays on the Evidences, Doctrines and Practical Operations of Christianity (1825)
History, Authority and Use of the Sabbath, (1831)
The Moral Character of Jesus Christ (1832)
A Winter in the West Indies (1840)
Religion and the New Testament (1843)
  in 2 volumes: vol. 1, vol. 2

See also
Gurney family (Norwich)
Gurney's bank

References

External links

Biography of Joseph John Gurney
Sermons by Gurney and his followers from the Quaker Homiletics Online Anthology
Verily Anderson, family biographer
. 

English bankers
Burials in Norfolk
English Quakers
People from Norwich (district)
Quaker evangelicals
Quaker theologians
Quaker writers
1788 births
1847 deaths
Joseph John
19th-century British businesspeople